Polaki is a village in the municipality of Kočani, North Macedonia.

Demographics
According to the 2002 census, the village had a total of 113 inhabitants. Ethnic groups in the village include:

Macedonians 113

References

External links
Village website

Villages in Kočani Municipality